Anthene lusones, the large red-spot ciliate blue, is a butterfly in the family Lycaenidae. It is found in Guinea, Sierra Leone, Ivory Coast, Ghana, Nigeria, Cameroon, Gabon, the Republic of the Congo, Angola, the Central African Republic, the Democratic Republic of the Congo, Sudan, Uganda and Tanzania. The habitat consists of forests.

Subspecies
Anthene lusones lusones (Nigeria: south and the Cross River loop, Cameroon, Gabon, Congo, Angola, Central African Republic, southern Sudan, Uganda, north-western Tanzania, Democratic Republic of Congo: Uele, Tshopo, Sankuru and Lualaba)
Anthene lusones fulvimacula (Mabille, 1890) (Guinea, Sierra Leone, Ivory Coast, Ghana)

References

Butterflies described in 1874
Anthene
Butterflies of Africa
Taxa named by William Chapman Hewitson